The Uruguay men's national water polo team is the representative for Uruguay in international men's water polo.

Results

Olympic Games
1936 — 13th place
1948 — 16th place

FINA Development Trophy
 2007 — 6th place
 2009 — 7th place
 2013 — 6th place
 2015 —  Silver Medal

Current roster
The following is the Uruguayan roster in the 2015 FINA World Water Polo Development Trophy.

Federico García
Martín Fernández
Facundo Cánepa
Joaquín Pérez
Pablo Brugnini
Ramiro García
Santiago San Martín
Gastón del Campo
Daniel Queipo
Diego Domínguez
Leonardo Samurio
Inti Sanguinet
Nicolás Paseyro

References

Water polo
Men's national water polo teams
National water polo teams in South America
National water polo teams by country
 
Men's sport in Uruguay